Smith Miller (May 30, 1804 – March 21, 1872) was a U.S. Representative from Indiana.

Born near Charlotte, North Carolina, Miller moved to Gibson County, Indiana, with his parents who settled in Patoka in 1813. He received a limited schooling and engaged in agricultural pursuits. He served as member of the Indiana House of Representatives from 1835 to 1839 and in 1846, and in the Indiana State Senate from 1841 to 1844 and from 1847 1850. He served as delegate to the state constitutional convention in 1850.

Miller was elected as a Democrat to the Thirty-third and Thirty-fourth Congresses (March 4, 1853 – March 3, 1857).
After his congressional service, he resumed agricultural pursuits, and served as delegate to the Democratic National Convention at Charleston, South Carolina, in 1860.

He died near Patoka, Indiana, March 21, 1872, and was interred in Robb Cemetery.

References

1804 births
1872 deaths
People from Gibson County, Indiana
Democratic Party members of the Indiana House of Representatives
Democratic Party Indiana state senators
Democratic Party members of the United States House of Representatives from Indiana
19th-century American politicians